State Road 909 (SR 909) is a  state highway in northern Miami-Dade County, Florida, United States, that runs along West Dixie Highway, the original alignment of the Dixie Highway, from the east end of Gratigny Drive (Florida State Road 924 [SR 924]/Northeast 119th Street) in North Miami northeast to North Miami Beach Boulevard (Florida State Road 826 [SR 826]/Northeast 163rd Street) in North Miami Beach, just across the Florida East Coast Railway from Biscayne Boulevard (U.S. Route 1 (US 1) and Florida State Road 5 (SR 5). SR 909 is actually in two pieces as motorists traveling the route in North Miami encounter signs on North Miami Boulevard (Florida State Road 922 [SR 922]/Northeast 125th Street) saying "TO 909" and "To W Dixie Hwy" and guiding them along a two-block "detour" to the other section.

Route description

SR 909 begins a few blocks to the northeast of Barry University, in unincorporated Miami-Dade County. The southern terminus of SR 909 is open to conjecture, as the Florida Department of Transportation (FDOT) states that the state-controlled section of the road begins at Northeast 119th Street, which corresponds to the eastern terminus of SR 924; however, signage on NE 119th Street indicates SR 909 begins further south, with some maps claiming SR 909's terminus to be at Northeast 2nd Avenue, the start of the signed West Dixie Highway. Regardless of the confusion of its origin, SR 909 continues in a north-easterly direction as a four-laned road past a mix of commercial and residential uses and crosses the Biscayne Canal to enter North Miami less than a quarter-mile north of SR 924. Past Griffing Boulevard, motorists are greeted with signage indicating "TO West Dixie Highway" and are directed to follow the one-way Northeast 123rd Street, with southbound traffic travelling via Northeast 124th Street. This is due to SR 909's interruption just south of a potential junction with Northeast 125th Street (SR 922); here, the road has been turned into a cul-de-sac with car parking spaces in the middle of the pavement.

SR 909 and the West Dixie Highway resume again half a block to the northeast of the cul-de-sac at a junction with Northeast 6th Avenue (SR 915), just a fraction north of SR 915's junction with SR 922, and resumes its northeast-southwest orientation as it leaves the commercial heart of North Miami. Due to its orientation, SR 909 creates oblique junctions and six-way intersections with surrounding streets. The West Dixie Highway is edged by storefronts as the road continues for the next three-quarters of a mile towards SR 916 (Northeast 135th Street). Shops lining the street continue as the norm as SR 909 carries on north-eastwards, interspersed with some low-rise apartment complexes. The road leaves North Miami near Northeast 143rd Street and enters North Miami Beach at Northeast 151st Street, becoming more residential in feel after this point as it passes parkland. As SR 909 approaches the Florida East Coast Railway tracks, it turns northwards and enters another commercial district. SR 909 then terminates a few blocks north of the turn at SR 826 (Northeast 163rd Street), a block west of Biscayne Boulevard (US 1), although the West Dixie Highway continues northwards in rough parallel to the railroad well into Broward County.

History
Since the current SR 909 was the original Dixie Highway, it was part of pre-1945 SR 4. This old alignment continued south on Northeast Second Avenue to downtown Miami (the southern part was designated State Road 815 until the mid-1990s), and north on streets named West Dixie Highway, North Dixie Highway, and South Dixie Highway to Dania, and was assigned the pre-1945 SR 176 designation in 1931. It, however, did not receive a number in the 1945 renumbering.

For some time, the old (West, South, and North) Dixie Highway from SR 826 in Miami-Dade County north to SR 824 (Pembroke Road) in Broward County was a section of State Road 5A.  This designation survived until the mid-1990s.

West Dixie Highway south of SR 826 received its current Florida Department of Transportation designation in 1983, replacing its original designation, State Road 929, which was applied by FDOT earlier in the decade.

Major intersections

See also

 List of state highways in Florida

References

External links

909
909
909
1983 establishments in Florida